, also known by his Chinese style name , was a prince of the Ryukyu Kingdom.

Chōki was born to the royal family Urasoe Udun. His father was Urasoe Chōei. Later, Chōki became the third head of Urasoe Udun.

Chōki served as sessei from 1835 to 1852. He was dispatched together with Zakimi Seifu in 1839 to celebrate Tokugawa Ieyoshi when he succeeded as shōgun of the Tokugawa shogunate. Chōki learned waka poetry from Kagawa Kageki during his journey. They sailed back the next year.

Chōki had no heir, and adopted his nephew Urasoe Chōchū as his son.

References

1805 births
1854 deaths
Princes of Ryūkyū
Sessei
People of the Ryukyu Kingdom
Ryukyuan people
19th-century Ryukyuan people